Derryneill is a townland of 1,049 acres in County Down, Northern Ireland, near to Leitrim, County Down. It is  situated in the civil parish of Drumgooland and the historic barony of Iveagh Upper, Lower Half. Derryneill is mainly made up of small rocky drumlins.

History
In 1609 Derryneill was part of the holding of Ballyward held by Shane McEvard.

See also
List of townlands in County Down

References

Townlands of County Down
Civil parish of Drumgooland